is a Japanese voice actor affiliated with Aptepro. Some of his notable roles include Hajime Nagumo in Arifureta: From Commonplace to World's Strongest, Genbu Kurono in The Idolmaster SideM, and Ard Meteor in The Greatest Demon Lord Is Reborn as a Typical Nobody.

Filmography

Television animation
2016
 All Out!! as Taihei Nōka

2017
 The Idolmaster SideM as Genbu Kurono

2018
 The Idolmaster SideM Wake Atte Mini! as Genbu Kurono

2019
 Ao-chan Can't Study! as Shūhei Yonezuka
 Arifureta: From Commonplace to World's Strongest as Hajime Nagumo

2020
 Tower of God as Hatz
 Yashahime: Princess Half-Demon as Ninja

2022
 Arifureta: From Commonplace to World's Strongest 2nd Season as Hajime Nagumo
 The Greatest Demon Lord Is Reborn as a Typical Nobody as Ard Meteor

2023
 The Fruit of Evolution 2 as Brood Lev Kaiser

TBA
 Arifureta: From Commonplace to World's Strongest 3rd Season as Hajime Nagumo

Video games
2014
 Freedom Wars as Noah, Benoit

2015
 Hortensia Saga: Aoi no Kishidan as Arnaud, Konstan, Rabi
 100 Sleeping Princes and the Kingdom of Dreams as Grad

2016
 The Idolmaster SideM as Genbu Kurono

2017
 Kizuna Striker! as Rei Shiwasu

2018
 Dream!ing as Issei Torasawa
 On Air! as Yukiya Amahashi
 Caravan Stories as Riardo

2019
 The King of Fighters for Girls as Andy Bogard

2020
 Touken Ranbu: Online as Jizou Yukihira
 Octopath Traveler: Champions of the Continent as Durand

2021
 Gate of Nightmares as Sigma
 World Flipper as Tōru Sengaku

2022
 The Thousand Musketeers: Rhodoknight as Murata
 Witch on the Holy Night as Tobimaru Tsukiji

Drama CD
2014
 Servamp as Sakuya Watanuki

References

External links
 Official agency profile 
 

Japanese male video game actors
Japanese male voice actors
Living people
Male voice actors from Yamagata Prefecture
Year of birth missing (living people)